Dustin Earl Belt (born December 3, 1987) is an American guitarist, music producer and actor.

He is best known as a founding member of the indie pop duo, Heffron Drive, and as the touring guitarist for the Nickelodeon/Sony boy band, Big Time Rush. Heffron Drive's first single, "Parallel", was released in March 2014 through the record label TOLBooth Records.

Heffron Drive's first album Happy Mistakes was released on September 9, 2014. Upon release, it charted at No. 84 on the Billboard Top 200 and at No. 14 on the Billboard Pop Charts.

Life and career

2001–2013: Career beginning
Belt was born in Wichita, Kansas, to Earl & Carol Belt. He began as an actor in kindergarten where he attended Buckner Performing Arts Magnet in Wichita. When he was 11 years old, his family moved from Kansas to California for pilot season. They returned to Kansas but shortly thereafter moved permanently to Los Angeles in 2001. Belt went on to have a career as a working commercial and print actor appearing in commercials for Allstate Insurance, Sony PlayStation, McDonald's, AT&T, Sony Vaio computers and many others. In 2004 Dustin met Kendall Schmidt at an industry event in Hollywood. They became immediate friends and later began the project known as Heffron Drive, named after the street they both lived on.

Schmidt had purchased some recording equipment and assembled a studio in his bedroom where the two began creating music together. They posted their music on the website Myspace, where they began garnering tens of thousands of "plays" a day. Dustin was referred to BTR's management by Kendall to be the lead guitarist for the live band. Dustin accepted the job and spent the next 4.5 years touring the world with the group, playing some of the most iconic venues in the world. His first show with the band was "The Today Show" in New York City where they played for a live crowd of 5,000 and a syndicated crowd of over 4 million. He can be seen in performances on "Ellen", "MTV Hits", "Live! With Kelly", "The National Tree Lighting Ceremony" among others.

While on the road with BTR, Dustin and Kendall would continue to work on music for Heffron Drive in their downtime.

2013–2018: Heffron Drive
After Big Time Rush ended in late 2013, Heffron Drive was revived as a band as the full-time project of Dustin & Kendall. They released their first single "Parallel" in early 2014. Happy Mistakes, Heffron Drive's first album, was released September 9, 2014, and premiered on the Billboard 200 at No. 84 and on the Billboard Pop Charts at No. 14. The band embarked on a 26 city tour to promote the album, covering a majority of the United States and addition dates in Mexico. In October through December 2014, Dustin co-produced Heffron Drive's acoustic album Happy Mistakes: Unplugged which was released April 28, 2015. The album was completely produced by Belt and Schmidt and released through Schmidt owned TOLBooth Records.

Heffron Drive performed at the "A Capitol Fourth" celebration broadcast on PBS in July 2014 and toured extensively internationally promoting both albums with stops in Mexico, Uruguay, Argentina, Brazil, and Italy among others. Dustin frequently worked with RedBull and RedBull.tv as a social media influencer, covering music festivals across America for the past few years. Heffron Drive announced via social media the release of their new EP The Slow Motion, which was released worldwide on February 10, 2017. The EP included 4 new songs, including the single "Living Room", released on January 13. A tour with stops in Mexico City, Monterrey, Guadalajara, Moscow, St. Petersburg, Amsterdam, Paris, Lyon, Milan, Turin and Rome took place in support of the EP release.

Discography

Writing credits

References

1987 births
Living people
Record producers from Kansas
21st-century American guitarists
Social media influencers